The  is a diesel multiple unit (DMU) train type operated by Hokkaido Railway Company (JR Hokkaido) on the Sassho Line in Japan since 1990. The cars were rebuilt from former 50 series locomotive-hauled coaches.

Variants
A total of 44 cars were built, between 1990 and 1995, divided into four main types: KiHa 141, KiHa 142, KiHa 143, and KiSaHa 144.
 KiHa 141: Single-engined cab cars, operate in conjunction with KiHa 142
 KiHa 142: Twin-engined cab cars, operate in conjunction with KiHa 141
 KiHa 143: Cab cars built 1994 with higher-rated engines
 KiSaHa 144: Non-powered intermediate cars built 1994

KiHa 141

14 KiHa 141 cars were built between 1990 and 1993 from surplus 50 series OHaFu 51 locomotive-hauled coaches, using the bogies and gearboxes from withdrawn KiHa 22 and KiHa 56 DMUs. These cars are formed as two-car sets with KiHa 142 cars. The KiHa 141 cars are powered by one DMF13HS  engine, and retain the original toilet of the 50 series coaches. These cars are not air-conditioned.

Build details
The build dates and former identities are as shown below.

KiHa 142

15 KiHa 142 cars were built between 1990 and 1995 from surplus 50 series OHaFu 51 locomotive-hauled coaches, using the bogies and gearboxes from withdrawn KiHa 22 and KiHa 56 DMUs. These cars are formed as two-car sets with KiHa 141 cars. The KiHa 142 cars are powered by two DMF13HS  engines, and the original toilet of the 50 series coaches was removed during rebuilding. These cars are not air-conditioned.

KiHa 142-14 was fitted with modified passenger door control circuits in 1995 and renumbered KiHa 142-114. KiHa 142-201 was built in 1995 from former 50 series coach OHaFu 51-30 for use in conjunction with KiHa 143 cars.

Build details
The build dates and former identities are as shown below.

KiHa 143

11 KiHa 143 cars were built in 1994 from surplus 50 series OHaFu 51 locomotive-hauled coaches to provide additional capacity on the Sassho Line. These cars are formed as two-car sets, consisting of KiHa 143-100 cars at the Sapporo end and KiHa 143-150 cars at the opposite end. The KiHa 143 cars are powered by two DMF13HZD  engines, and used bogies based on the KiHa 150 design. The KiHa 143-150 cars retain the original toilet of the 50 series coaches. All cars were fitted with air-conditioning from 1996.

Passenger accommodation consists of transverse seating bays arranged 2+1 abreast, with longitudinal bench seating at the car ends.

A number of KiHa 143 twin-car sets were modified for use on wanman driver-only operation services.

The fleet of KiHa 143 cars is scheduled to be replaced by new 737 series AC electric multiple units from spring 2023.

Build details
The build dates and former identities are as shown below.

KiSaHa 144

Four KiSaHa 144 non-powered intermediate cars were built in 1994 from surplus 50 series OHaFu 51 locomotive-hauled coaches. Originally used sandwiched between KiHa 141 and KiHa 142 cars, they were later used between pairs of KiHa 143 cars. All cars were fitted with air-conditioning in 2001.

Passenger accommodation consists of transverse seating bays arranged 2+1 abreast, with longitudinal bench seating at the car ends.

Build details
The build dates and former identities are as shown below.

KiSaHa 144-104 was initially numbered KiSaHa 144-151, but was renumbered KiSaHa 144-104 in August 1995 following removal of its toilet at Naebo Works.

History

A large number of locomotive-hauled 50 series coaches became surplus to requirements following electrification of lines in the Sapporo area of Hokkaido in the late 1980s. A program was therefore started to rebuild a number of these coaches into diesel multiple unit (DMU) trains to replace ageing DMUs on the non-electrified Sassho Line. In March 1990, one two-car set, formed of KiHa 141-1 and KiHa 142-1, was formed at Kushiro Depot and transferred to Naebo Depot from April of that year. Between 1990 and 1995, a total of 44 DMUs cars were built from former 50 series coaches at Kushiro Depot, Goryokaku Depot, and Naebo Works.

Withdrawals and resale
The first two cars built, KiHa 141-1 and KiHa 142-1, were withdrawn in March 2005.

Four KiHa 141 series cars, KiHa 143-155, KiSaHa 144-103, KiSaHa 144-101, and KiHa 142-201, were sold to JR East and moved to Koriyama Works in November 2012 for conversion into the SL Ginga Joyful Train set for use with the restored JNR Class C58 steam locomotive C58 239 from April 2014.

A number of cars were sold to Myanmar National Railways.

References

This article incorporates information from the corresponding article in the Japanese Wikipedia.
141
Hokkaido Railway Company
Train-related introductions in 1990
Passenger rail transport in Myanmar